is a passenger railway station located in the city of Ōtsu, Shiga Prefecture, Japan, operated by the West Japan Railway Company (JR West). It is also a freight deport for the Japan Freight Railway Company (JR Freight). The station is located adjacent to the Keihan Electric Railway Keihan-ishiyama Station with which it is connected by a concourse.

Lines

Station layout
The station consists of two island platforms with 4 tracks on the ground and 2 siding tracks on both sides of the outer tracks. The station has a Midori no Madoguchi staffed ticket office.

Platforms

Adjacent stations

History
The route of the Tōkaidō Main Line passed through Ishiyama in 1889, but no station was built until 1 April 1903. On 25 April 1930 a derailment accident occurred at the station when an express train from Tokyo en route to Shimonoseki overturned when passing a point at high speed. Thirteen people were injured, but there were no fatalities. The station became part of the JR West network on 1 April 1987 with the privation of the Japan National Railway (JNR).

Station numbering was introduced to the station in March 2018 with Ishiyama being assigned station number JR-A27.

Passenger statistics
In fiscal 2019, the station was used by an average of 24,103 passengers (boarding passengers only) in 2019, making it the 26th-busiest station by traffic in the West Japan Railway Company's network.

Surrounding area
Renesas Semiconductor Manufacturing Shiga Factory (formerly Renesas Kansai Semiconductor)
Nippon Electric Glass Headquarters / Otsu Office
NSK Otsu Factory

See also
List of railway stations in Japan

References

External links

JR West official home page

Railway stations in Japan opened in 1914
Tōkaidō Main Line
Railway stations in Shiga Prefecture
Railway stations in Ōtsu
Stations of Japan Freight Railway Company